William David Parker (January 14, 1942 – February 9, 2003) was a professional baseball player who played parts of three seasons for the California Angels of Major League Baseball. He is the first player to hit a walk-off homer in his major league debut, doing so on September 9, 1971 for the Angels.

Parker's professional baseball career began in 1961 with the Negro league Indianapolis Clowns, where he played through 1964. He was selected by the New York Yankees from the Salt Lake City Angels in the Rule 5 draft on December 3, 1973.

References

External links

1947 births
2003 deaths
African-American baseball players
Águilas Cibaeñas players
American expatriate baseball players in the Dominican Republic
American expatriate baseball players in Mexico
Arizona Instructional League Angels players
Baseball players from Alabama
California Angels players
Deaths from cancer in Arizona
El Paso Sun Kings players
Indianapolis Clowns players
Major League Baseball second basemen
People from Hayneville, Alabama
People from Sun City West, Arizona
Plataneros de Tabasco players
Salt Lake City Angels players
Sportspeople from the Phoenix metropolitan area
Sultanes de Monterrey players
Syracuse Chiefs players
Tiburones de La Guaira players
American expatriate baseball players in Venezuela
20th-century African-American sportspeople
21st-century African-American people